The following article is a summary of the 2018–19 football season in Cyprus, which is the 77th season of competitive football in the country and runs from August 2018 to May 2019.

UEFA competitions

UEFA Champions League

Qualifying phase and play-off round

First qualifying round 

|}

UEFA Europa League

Champions Path

Qualifying phase and play-off round

Second qualifying round

|}

Third qualifying round

|}

Play-off round

|}

Main Path

Qualifying phase and play-off round

First qualifying round

|}

Second qualifying round

|}

Third qualifying round

|}

Play-off round

|}

Notes

Group stage

Group A

Group H

UEFA Youth League

Domestic Champions Path

First round

|}

Men's football

Cypriot First Division

Regular season

Play-offs

Cypriot Second Division

Cypriot Third Division

STOK Elite Division

References

 
Seasons in Cypriot football